Eban and Charley is a 2000 independent drama film written and directed by James Bolton. It follows the romantic relationship between Eban (Brent Fellows), a 29-year-old gay man, and Charley (Gio Black Peter), a 14-year-old boy. Despite being about a very controversial topic (namely, age disparity in sexual relationships), the film addresses these issues in a low-key, relaxed manner. The film also addresses the consequences that Eban and Charley's relationship provokes with their parents. Its plot is based on an incident in which one of Bolton's friends was dumped by his older boyfriend, because their parents did not approve of their age disparity.

Cast
Brent Fellows as Eban
Gio Black Peter as Charley
Nolan V. Chard as Charley's father
Ron Upton as Eban's father
Ellie Nicholson as Sunshine
Drew Zeller as Kevin
Pam Munter as Eban's mother

Soundtrack

The soundtrack to Eban and Charley was written and recorded by The Magnetic Fields' Stephin Merritt. The soundtrack album was released on January 22, 2002 on Merge Records, and was Merritt's first recording under his birth name. Merritt told Rolling Stone that he wanted to keep the music to the film open-ended, saying of the film, "If it was a love story it would be gushy strings, and if it were a horror show it would be horn blasts, so I decided to go a third way."

According to Metacritic, the film's soundtrack album has received generally favorable reviews from critics, with a score of 68 out of 100. Richie Unterberger gave it 3 out of 5 stars in a review he wrote for AllMusic and named it his fifth favorite album of 2001 in his list for Rolling Stone, writing "This soundtrack isn't a major effort from the Magnetic Fields man, but a modest triumph of subdued gloom all the same."

Track listing
	Mother –	0:38
	Cricket Problem –	2:18
	Some Sunny Day –	1:46
	O Tannenbaum –	2:05
	Poppyland –	3:19
	Drowned Sailors –	1:37
	Maria Maria Maria –	4:26
	Titles –	1:28
	This Little Ukulele –	1:21
	Tea Party –	1:09
	Tiny Flying Player Pianos –	1:14
	Mother Remembered –	0:45
	Victorian Robots –	2:06
	Water Torture –	3:02
	Greensleeves –	2:46
	Stage Rain –	6:58

Release
The film was first released at the Frameline Film Festival (then known as the San Francisco International Lesbian & Gay Film Festival) on June 12, 2000. On December 14, 2001, it was released on video by Picture This! Entertainment. In 2002, it opened at the Cinema Village in New York City.

Reception
The film received largely negative reviews from critics. On Rotten Tomatoes, it has a score of 33%, based on 9 critics' reviews, and on Metacritic, it has a score of 30 out of 100, indicating "generally unfavorable reviews," based on 11 reviews.

The New York Times Elvis Mitchell gave the film a 1 out of 5 rating, writing that it "might best be described as preaching to a sparse congregation, or else [Director James] Bolton is simply out to bore people into submission." Ed Park of the Village Voice wrote that "Preachy and humorless, Eban and Charley shocks only by the quality of its numbing solipsism." Maitland McDonagh, writing for TV Guide, gave the film one star out of 4, calling it "earnest but unenlightening" and writing that Bolton "undermines his own carefully balanced presentation of the situation by making 29-year-old Eban so creepy."

The Los Angeles Times Kevin Thomas was more favorable, writing in his review of the film that "Few people will be able to go along with Bolton's point of view regarding relationships between adults and underage youths, but there's no denying the writer-director, in his feature debut, has avoided sensationalism in telling this story." Another favorable review was written in the Chicago Tribune by Patrick Z. McGavin, who gave the film 3 out of 4 stars. McGavin wrote that "The movie is never cheap or sensationalistic, and the performances are finely understated. Though he shot the work on video, Bolton draws on brooding Pacific Northwest locations to excellent effect."

References

External links
Eban and Charley at Rotten Tomatoes

2000 independent films
2000 films
2000 romantic drama films
Films shot in Astoria, Oregon
Films shot in Portland, Oregon
Films set in Astoria, Oregon
Films set in Portland, Oregon
Films set in Oregon
Films shot in Oregon